Beinn an Eoin (855 m) is a mountain in the Northwest Highlands, Scotland. It lies in the remote Torridon Hills in Wester Ross, south of the village of Gairloch.

References

Mountains and hills of the Northwest Highlands
Marilyns of Scotland
Corbetts